Bawumia is a Ghanaian surname. Notable people with the surname include:

Mahamudu Bawumia (born 1963), Ghanaian economist and banker
Mumuni Bawumia, Ghanaian politician and writer
Samira Bawumia (born 1980), Ghanaian politician

Ghanaian surnames